Isabella Bennet FitzRoy, Duchess of Grafton and later 2nd Countess of Arlington suo jure (c. 1668 – 7 February 1723), was a British peer and heiress.

Life
Isabella Bennet was the only daughter of Henry Bennet, 1st Earl of Arlington, a Royalist commander, by his wife, Elisabeth of Nassau (1633–1718). Elisabeth was a daughter of Louis of Nassau-Beverweerd and thus a granddaughter of Maurice of Nassau, Prince of Orange, and a great-granddaughter of William the Silent.

Henry Bennet was created Baron Arlington in 1665 for his loyalty to the crown. Lord Arlington was later raised in the peerage to the titles of Earl of Arlington and Viscount Thetford, all of which were created with a special remainder to allow his daughter to inherit.

She was married at the age of four to Henry FitzRoy, Earl of Euston (later created Duke of Grafton), the nine-year-old illegitimate son of King Charles II. The wedding ceremony was repeated on 7 November 1679 and they lived at Euston Hall. Isabella and her husband had one son, Charles FitzRoy, who succeeded his parents as 2nd Duke of Grafton and 3rd Earl of Arlington. 

After her husband's death in 1690 from a wound received at the storming of Cork while leading the forces of William of Orange, she remarried on 14 October 1698 to Sir Thomas Hanmer, 4th Baronet, Speaker of the House of Commons. They remained married until her death on 7 February 1723.

Other
Isabella was one of the Hampton Court Beauties painted by Sir Godfrey Kneller for Queen Mary II. Isabella also walked at the coronation of Queen Anne.

References

External links
"Isabella Fitzroy (née Bennet), Duchess of Grafton ", FitzWilliam Museum
"Isabella Fitzroy (née Bennet), Duchess of Grafton", ''National Portrait Gallery

1660s births
1723 deaths
Year of birth uncertain
FitzRoy
English duchesses by marriage
Wives of baronets
Daughters of British earls
Arlington, Isabella FitzRoy, 2nd Countess of
Isabella
Wives of knights